Konstantin Päts' third cabinet was in office in Estonia from 12 February 1931 to 19 February 1932, when it was succeeded by Jaan Teemant's fourth cabinet.

Members

This cabinet's members were the following:

References

Cabinets of Estonia